The Blériot 111 was a French four-seat executive transport monoplane designed by André Herbemont. The first French aircraft to be fitted with a retractable landing gear, after six years development it was not ordered into production.

Design and development 
The Bleriot 111 was a low-wing single-engined monoplane with an enclosed passenger cabin and an open cockpit for the pilot forward of the cabin. The first variant was the Bleriot 111/1 which first flew on 24 January 1929 powered by a  Hispano-Suiza 6Mbr 6-cyl. water-cooled in-line engine. In October 1929 a second variant flew (known as the 111bis or 111/2) which had a modified landing gear. The 111/2 was re-engined with a  Gnome & Rhône 9Ady radial engine and re-designated 111/3. The 111/3 was flown as part of the Patrouille Blériot which gave exhibitions and demonstrations around France and Spain in the 1930s.

The 111/1 was modified as the 111/4 with a revised wing bracing, a  Hispano-Suiza 12Jb engine and retractable landing gear,a first for a French aircraft. The 111/4 flew on 27 October 1930. The next variant was the 111/5 which moved the pilot's cockpit to the rear of the passenger cabin and was fitted with a  Hispano-Suiza 12Mbr engine. A re-engined variant of the 111/5 was fitted with a  Gnome-Rhône K-14(sic) radial engine and was named Sagittaire.

Sagittaire later fitted with a new wing and  Gnome & Rhône 14Kbrs, was re-designated 111/6. The 111/6 was entered into the 1934 London to Melbourne air race but it was withdrawn when the landing gear was damaged two days before the race start. With no commercial interest in the design no more Bleriot 111s were built.

Variants

Bleriot 111/1Powered by a  Hispano-Suiza 6Mbr 6-cyl. water-cooled in-line engine.
Bleriot 111/2 / bisModified landing gear.
Bleriot 111/3The 111/2 re-engined with a  Gnome & Rhône 9Ady radial engine. This aircraft ended up in the Spanish Republican Air Force during the Spanish Civil War.
Bleriot 111/4The 111/1 was modified as the 111/4 with a revised wing bracing, a  Hispano-Suiza 12Jb engine and retractable landing gear,a first for a French aircraft.
Bleriot 111/5The pilot's cockpit moved to the rear of the passenger cabin and fitted with a  Hispano-Suiza 12Mbr engine.
SagittaireA re-engined variant of the 111/5 was fitted with a  Gnome-Rhône K-14(sic) radial engine and was named Sagittaire.
Bleriot 111/6Sagittaire later fitted with a new wing and  Gnome & Rhône 14Kbrs

Operators

French Air Force

Spanish Republican Air Force - Bleriot 111/3

Specifications (111/6)

See also

References

Notes

Sources

1920s French civil utility aircraft
111
Low-wing aircraft
Single-engined tractor aircraft
Aircraft first flown in 1929